Leucanopsis goodgeri is a moth of the family Erebidae. It was described by Hervé de Toulgoët in 2003. It is found in Peru.

References

 

goodgeri
Moths described in 2003